Artex Film is an Italian film production and distribution company founded in 2017.

The company catalogue counts over 100 movies between short and feature films.

History 
The company was founded in 2017.

In 2018, Artex Film co-distributes with Venice Film, the feature film Red Land (movie about the dramas of foibe and istrian exodus).

In 2020, due to the COVID-19 crisis, the feature film Darkness, distributed by Artex Film and Courier Film, is the first movie to be released in direct to video on the platform Mymovies.it.

The company participate annually in various markets and festivals including Clermont-Ferrand International Short Film Festival and Marché du Film.

Partial filmography

Production

Distribution 
Some feature films distributed by Artex Film:

Some short films distributed by Artex Film:

See also 
 Cinema of Italy

Notes

References

External links 
 

Companies based in Padua
Film distributors of Italy
Film production companies of Italy
Italian companies established in 2017